Vazhuvoor Ramaiah Pillai (1910–1991) was an Indian Bharatanatyam dance teacher and choreographer.

Early life 
Vazhuvoor Bagyathammal Ramaiah Pillai was born in 1910 to Parthiban and Bagyathammal in Vazhuvoor. He learned the arts of Nattuvangam and Bharatanatyam from his maternal uncle Maanikka Nattuvanar.

Career 
He introduced innovative trials in Bharatanatyam. He advocated traditional vazhuvoor bani from his ancestors, dating to the days of the Chola dynasty. He popularized this bani around the globe, especially through his star disciple Kamala. He implemented Rama Natak Kiruti, Tyagaraya Swami Kiruti, Bharathiyar songs, Kutralak Kuravanji, Arunachala Kavi songs, and Oottukkadu Venkata Kavi songs through his teaching. During the time that the British had banned Bharathiyar's songs, Vazhuvoor made these songs performed by his students in stage plays, thereby encouraging the support of Indian Independence.

Family 
He married Gnanasoundiram (late). They had six children: daughter Jayalakshmi (late); son Natya Kala Samrat Vazhuvoor Samraj (late, a renowned dance master); son Manoharan (late); son Vazhuvoor.R.Gurunathan (late, banker/financial advisor); daughter Bagyalashmi (knowledgeable in classical dance); son Manikka Vinayagam (popular movie singer), in order of birth.

Notable students
 Lalitha-Padmini-Ragini
 Kumari Kamala
 Kumari Rhadha
 Radha Viswanathan
 Vyjayanthimala
 E. V. Saroja
 Rajasulochana
 Rita
 Hemamalini Arni
 Padma Subrahmanyam
 Kanaka Srinivasan
 Chitra Visweswaran
 M. Bhanumathi
 Amala Shankar
 Padmini Ramachandran

Awards
The following are the awards received by Vazhuvoorar:
 Isai Perarignar, 1961; given by Tamil Isai Sangam at Chennai
 Sangeet Natak Akademi Award, 1966 
 Sangeetha Kalasikhamani, 1979
 Padmasri
 Kalaimamani
 Naatya Kala Kesari

See also 
Vazhuvoor style

References

Sources 
Vazhuvoorar School of Classical Dance & Music
Vazhuvoorar Classical Bharathanatya Arts Centre
Descendant of an illustrious tradition
Lion's lineage
Thinakaran Yaazh Pongal Festival
Reference about Poet Vali
Shree Vazhuvoorar Classical Bharathanatya Art's Academy-REGD

1910 births
1979 deaths
Recipients of the Kalaimamani Award
Recipients of the Sangeet Natak Akademi Award
Recipients of the Padma Shri in arts
Dance teachers
Nattuvanars
Bharatanatyam exponents